Diadegma brevivalve, also known as Diadegma valachicum, is a wasp first described by Thomson in 1887.
No subspecies are listed.

References

brevivalve
Insects described in 1887